The name Genevieve has been used for seven tropical cyclones in the Eastern Pacific Ocean. 
 Hurricane Genevieve (1984) - A Category 3 hurricane that passed offshore Mexico and dissipated near the southern tip of the Baja California Peninsula
 Hurricane Genevieve (1990) - Category 2 hurricane, no effect on land
 Tropical Storm Genevieve (1996) - Long-lived tropical storm, no effect on land
 Tropical Storm Genevieve (2002) - Strong tropical storm, no effect on land
 Hurricane Genevieve (2008) - Minimal Category 1, no effect on land
 Hurricane Genevieve (2014) - A long-lasting tropical cyclone crossing all three North Pacific basins
 Hurricane Genevieve (2020) - A powerful Category 4 hurricane that affected the southern tip of the Baja California Peninsula

In the South-West Indian:
 Cyclone Genevieve (1970) – a strong tropical cyclone affected Madagascar.

Pacific hurricane set index articles